The lament for Sumer and Urim or the lament for Sumer and Ur is a poem and one of five known Mesopotamian "city laments"—dirges for ruined cities in the voice of the city's tutelary goddess.

The other city laments are:
The Lament for Ur
The Lament for Nippur
The Lament for Eridu
The Lament for Uruk

In 2004 BCE, during the last year of King Ibbi-Sin's reign, Ur fell to an Elamite army leading by king Kindattu of Shimashki. The Sumerians decided that such a catastrophic event could only be explained through divine intervention and wrote in the lament that the gods, "An, Enlil, Enki and Ninmah decided [Ur's] fate"

The literary works of the Sumerians were widely translated (e.g., by the Hittites, Hurrians and Canaanites). Sumeria historian Samuel Noah Kramer wrote that later Greek as well as Hebrew texts "were profoundly influenced by them." Contemporary scholars have drawn parallels between the lament and passages from the bible (e.g., "the Lord departed from his temple and stood on the mountain east of Jerusalem (Ezekiel 10:18-19)."

References

External links
Translation of the Lament for Sumer and Urim, from the Electronic Text Corpus of Sumerian Literature

Sumerian texts
Clay tablets
Mesopotamian myths
Comparative mythology
Ur
Poems about cities